The first series of Glow Up: Britain's Next Make-Up Star began on 6 March 2019 on BBC Three, and concluded on 24 April 2019. The series was hosted by Stacey Dooley, and was judged by industry professionals Dominic Skinner and Val Garland. Various guest stars including David Malinowski and NikkieTutorials appeared. The series was won by Ellis Atlantis, with Nikki Patel as runner-up and Leigh Easthope in third place.

Contestants
(Ages stated are at time of contest)

: Brana was known as Brandon on Series 1, before transitioning.

Contestant progress

  The contestant won Glow Up.
 The contestant was a runner-up.
 The contestant came in third place.
 The contestant won the challenge.  
 The contestant was originally in the red chair but later declared safe.
 The contestant was originally safe but later up for elimination.
 The contestant was originally safe but later up for elimination and was then further eliminated.
 The contestant was in the red chair and still eligible for elimination.
 The contestant won the challenge but was up for elimination, but not eliminated.
 The contestant won the challenge but was eliminated. 
 The contestant decided to leave the competition.
 The contestant was in the red chair and was then further eliminated.

Face offs
The face off is a mini challenge lasting 10 minutes. After then 10 minutes the judges will choose who will get eliminated and who will stay in the competition. The challenge content normally focuses on one section of the face (e.g. Lips, Eyes).

 The contestant was eliminated after their first time in the face off.
 The contestant was eliminated after their second time in the face off.
 The contestant was eliminated after their third time in the face off.
 The contestant won the final face off and became Britain’s First Make Up Star.

Guest judges

 Lisa Oxenham (Episode 1)
 David Malinowski (Episode 2)
 NikkieTutorials (Episode 3)
 Caroline Barnes (Episode 4)
 Kim Chi (Episode 5)
 Lan Nguyen-Grealis (Episode 6)
 Rankin (photographer) (Episode 8)

Special guests

 Amy-Leigh Hickman
 Anne Hegerty
 Arielle Free
 Chizzy Akudolu
 Gemma Atkinson
 Sunetra Sarker
 Yazmin Oukhellou

Episodes

References

2019 British television seasons